Crack the Sky is an American rock band.

Crack the Sky may also refer to:

 Crack the Sky (Crack the Sky album), 1975
 Crack the Sky (Mylon LeFevre and Broken Heart album), 1987
 "Crack the Sky", a song by Buckethead
 "Crack the Sky", a song on the Amon Amarth album Berzerker, 2019

See also
 "Play Crack the Sky", a song by the band Brand New from Deja Entendu, 2003
 Crack the Skye, a 2009 album by Mastodon
 Crack in the Sky, a 1997 novel by Terry C. Johnston